James or Jim Low(e) may refer to:

Sportsmen
James Low (footballer, born 1894) (1894–1960), Scottish footballer who played for Hearts
James Low (Scottish footballer), Scottish international (1891) who played for Cambuslang
James Lowe (footballer), Scottish international (1887) who played for St Bernard's
James Lowe (rower) (born 1956), Australian rower
James Lowe (rugby union) (born 1992), Ireland rugby union player
James Lowe (cricketer) (born 1982), English cricketer

Others
James Lowe (musician) (born 1943), American singer with The Electric Prunes
Jim Lowe (1923–2016), American singer-songwriter
James Lowe (conductor) (born 1976), English conductor and violist
James Lowe (inventor) (1798–1866), English inventor
James Low (East India Company officer) (1791–1852), Scottish military officer and scholar of Siamese language and culture
James B. Lowe, American actor
James F. Low, United States Air Force officer